Sialkot Chamber of Commerce & Industry (SCCI) is located in Sialkot, Punjab, Pakistan. It is the only business chamber in Pakistan to operate its own domestic commercial airline currently known as Air Sial. The chamber was able to gain an air licence after it made a successful application to the Pakistan Civil Aviation Authority.

See also
 Sialkot
 Sialkot District
 Sialkot International Airport Limited
 Sialkot International Airport
 Sialkot Dry Port

Reference 

Chambers of commerce in Pakistan
Economy of Sialkot